Craugastor merendonensis is a species of frogs in the family Craugastoridae.

It is endemic to Honduras.
Its natural habitats are subtropical or tropical moist lowland forests and rivers.

References

merendon
Endemic fauna of Honduras
Amphibians of Honduras
Frogs of North America
Critically endangered fauna of North America
Amphibians described in 1933
Taxonomy articles created by Polbot